Alexandre Liess (born June 20, 1991) is a Swiss swimmer, who specialized in freestyle and butterfly events. He is a 10-time Swiss swimming champion, and currently holds age group national records in the 200 m butterfly. Liess is a member of SSG Saar Max Ritter in Germany, under his Russian-born coach Gennadi Touretski, who is best known for training multiple Olympic medalists Alexander Popov and Michael Klim in the late 1990s.

Liess qualified for the men's 200 m butterfly at the 2012 Summer Olympics in London, by breaking a Swiss record and eclipsing the FINA B-cut off time of 1:58.13 at the European Championships in Debrecen, Hungary. He challenged seven other swimmers in the second heat, including former semifinalist Hsu Chi-chieh of the Chinese Taipei. Liess was in last place by 0.16 of a second behind Canada's David Sharpe. Liess failed to advance into the semifinals, as he placed thirty-third overall in the preliminaries.

References

External links
NBC Olympics Profile

1991 births
Living people
Swiss male freestyle swimmers
Olympic swimmers of Switzerland
Swimmers at the 2012 Summer Olympics
Swiss male butterfly swimmers
Sportspeople from Geneva
21st-century Swiss people